Bill Greene (November 15, 1930 – December 2, 2002) was an American politician. He served as a Democratic member of the California State Assembly and the California State Senate, representing South Central Los Angeles, Watts, Bell, Compton, Cudahy, Huntington Park and South Gate for twenty-five years.

Early life
William Bradshaw Greene Jr. was born on November 30, 1930 in Kansas City, Missouri.

Greene attended the University of Michigan. During the Civil Rights Movement, he demonstrated alongside Julian Bond, Stokley Carmichael and James Farmer, and he was jailed in Mississippi and Louisiana for his activism.

Career
Greene started his career as an assistant to Jesse M. Unruh. He was the first African American to work as an assistant in the California State Assembly. He was also a lobbyist for the Service Employees International Union.

Greene served as a Democratic member of the California State Assembly from 1967 to 1975. He served as a member of the California State Senate from 1975 to 1992. He succeeded Mervyn M. Dymally, another African-American politician, in both houses. In the senate, he represented "South-Central Los Angeles, Watts, Bell, Compton, Cudahy, Huntington Park and South Gate". He served as the chairman of the Senate Industrial Relations Committee. However, in 1989-1991, he "missed more than 50% of Senate votes" due to poor health, which led to his retirement.

The Bill Greene Sports Complex in Cudahy was named in his honor in 1991.

Personal life
Greene married Yvonne LaFargue. They had two daughters, Alisa Rochelle and Jan Andrea. He was an alcoholic, and he received treatment at the Betty Ford Center in 1989. He had a heart attack in March 1990.

Death
Greene died on December 2, 2002, at the Kaiser South Sacramento Medical Center in Sacramento, California.

References

External links
Join California Bill Greene

1930 births
2002 deaths
Politicians from Kansas City, Missouri
People from South Los Angeles
University of Michigan alumni
Democratic Party members of the California State Assembly
Democratic Party California state senators
American lobbyists
20th-century American politicians
African-American state legislators in California
20th-century African-American politicians
African-American men in politics
21st-century African-American people